A fault scarp is a small step or offset on the ground surface where one side of a fault has moved vertically with respect to the other. It is the topographic expression of faulting attributed to the displacement of the land surface by movement along faults. They are exhibited either by differential movement and subsequent erosion along an old inactive geologic fault (a sort of old rupture), or by a movement on a recent active fault.

Characteristics

Fault scarps often contain highly fractured rock of both hard and weak consistency. In many cases, bluffs form from the upthrown block and can be very steep. The height of the scarp formation is equal to the vertical displacement along the fault. Active scarps are usually formed by tectonic displacement, e.g. when an earthquake changes the elevation of the ground and can be caused by any type of fault, including strike-slip faults, whose motion is primarily horizontal. This movement is usually episodic, with the height of the bluffs being the result of multiple movements over time. Displacement of around 5 to 10 meters per tectonic event is common.

Due to the dramatic uplift along the fault, the fault scarp is very prone to erosion, especially if the material being uplifted consists of unconsolidated sediment. Weathering, mass wasting, and water runoff can soon wear down these bluffs, sometimes resulting in V-shaped valleys along runoff channels. Adjacent V-shaped valley formations give the remaining fault spurs a very triangular shape. This formation is known as a triangular facet; however, this landform is not limited to fault scarps.

Fault scarps may be only a few centimeters or many meters high. Fault-line scarps are coincident with faults, but are most typically formed by the erosion of weaker rocks that have been brought alongside more resistant ones by the movement along the fault. In the case of old eroded fault scarps, active erosion may have moved the physical cliff back away from the actual fault location which may be buried beneath a talus, alluvial fan or the sediments of the valley fill.

Examples

 The Teton Range in Wyoming is an example of an active fault scarp. The dramatic topography of the Tetons is due to geologically recent activity on the Teton Fault.
 Fault scarps in Motosu, Japan, created by the 1891 Mino–Owari earthquake.
 The fault scarps bounding the East African Rift Valley.
 The fault scarps bounding the Rio Grande Rift in New Mexico.

References

Sources
Easterbrook, D. J. (1999) Surface processes and landforms. (Second Ed). Prentice Hall, Upper Saddle River, New Jersey.

Tectonic landforms
Structural geology
Seismic faults